The Casey's General Store 150 is a NASCAR K&N Pro Series East and NASCAR K&N Pro Series West combined race held annually at Iowa Speedway. From 2007 to 2010, it was a  race. In 2010, it was a  race.

From 2007 through 2016 there were two different winners in the race (one in the East and the other in the West). The overall winner received the win in the series that the driver was eligible for points while the best placed driver from the other series also received the win (in the other series). Starting at 2017, the overall winner receives two separate wins (one in the East and the other in the West).

Starting in 2011 the race became a support race for the NASCAR Xfinity Series weekend.

Past winners

 2010, 2012 (1 of 2), and 2013 (1 of 2): Race extended due to a green-white-checker finish.

Notes

Support race winners (Pre 2011)

References

External links
http://hometracks.nascar.com/tracks/Iowa
 

ARCA Menards Series East
ARCA Menards Series West
NASCAR races at Iowa Speedway
2007 establishments in Iowa
Recurring sporting events established in 2007